Cara Koenen (born 27 February 1996) is an Australian netball player in the Suncorp Super Netball league, playing for the Sunshine Coast Lightning.

Koenan was a foundation player at the Lightning ahead of the club's inaugural season in 2017. She has remained at the club since that time and was most recently re-signed for the 2020 season. She is the only netballer in the league to have originated from Magnetic Island, which is off the coast of Townsville in northern Queensland.

On 10 July 2021, Koenen played her 50th national league game, all for the Lightning.

Koenen came off the bench to play goal shooter in the gold medal match at the 2022 Commonwealth Games, scoring 15 goals from 15 shots to help Australia win against Jamaica 55–51.

References

External links
 Sunshine Coast Lightning profile
 Suncorp Super Netball profile
 Netball Draft Central profile

1996 births
Australian netball players
Sunshine Coast Lightning players
Living people
Netball players at the 2022 Commonwealth Games
Commonwealth Games gold medallists for Australia
Commonwealth Games medallists in netball
Suncorp Super Netball players
Territory Storm players
Australian Netball League players
Netball players from Queensland
Indigenous Australian netball players
Queensland state netball league players
Medallists at the 2022 Commonwealth Games